Patrick James Byrne, M.M. (October 26, 1888 – November 25, 1950) was an American-born Catholic missionary and Bishop. As a member of the Catholic Foreign Mission Society of America (Maryknoll), he was

assigned for missions in Korea and Japan. He served as the Prefect Apostolic of Pyongyang from 1927 to 1929, Prefect Apostolic of Kyoto from 1937 to 1940, Apostolic Visitor to Korea from 1947 to 1949, and the Apostolic Delegate to Korea from 1949 to 1950. He died under the custody of the Communists in Korea.

Early life
Born in Washington, D.C., Patrick Byrne was educated by the Sulpicians at St. Charles College in Ellicott City, Maryland, and St. Mary's Seminary in Baltimore. He was ordained as priest for the Archdiocese of Baltimore on June 23, 1915.

Priest
A week after he was ordained, Byrne was given permission by Cardinal James Gibbons to enter Maryknoll. He served the community in a variety of capacities.  He supervised construction projects at Maryknoll and at Scranton, Pennsylvania, and then served as the rector of both seminaries. He was the editor of Field Afar, and he served as the community's Vicar General and treasurer.

In 1923 Byrne organized the first Maryknoll Mission to Korea. On November 9, 1927, Pope Pius XI named him the Prefect Apostolic of Pyongyang. In 1929 he was a delegate to the first General Chapter of Maryknoll and he was elected the Assistant Superior General. He resigned his position as Prefect Apostolic on August 12, 1929, to take up his new responsibilities. In 1935 Byrne reentered the mission field, this time in Kyoto, Japan. Pope Pius XI named him the Prefect Apostolic of Kyoto on June 18, 1937. He resigned this office on October 10, 1940, in favor of a Japanese priest. Because of his charitable reputation he was not imprisoned during the Second World War, but held under house arrest. He made radio broadcasts on behalf of the United States Army to calm the Japanese people as the Americans occupied Japan at the conclusion of the war.

Bishop
Pope Pius XII appointed Byrne Apostolic Visitor of the Holy See to Korea on July 17, 1947. On April 7, 1949, Pope Pius named him the Titular Bishop of Gazera and the first Apostolic Delegate to Korea. Byrne was consecrated a bishop on June 14, 1949, by Auxiliary Bishop of New York Thomas McDonnell. The principal co-consecrators were Bishops Paul Marie Kinam Ro, Apostolic Vicar of Seoul, and Andrien-Joseph Larribeau, Apostolic Vicar emeritus of Seoul.

He was in Seoul when North Korea forces invaded South Korea in June 1950 and occupied the city. He was arrested by the Communists on July 2, 1950, and put on trial. He was placed on a march that went through the former Maryknoll Mission territory to the Yalu River. Byrne was put of trial again in Pyongyong and was forced on another march that lasted four months. The weather was bad and there was little food or shelter. Byrne came down with pneumonia and died on November 25, 1950, at the age of 62. He was buried by fellow prisoner, Monsignor Thomas F. Quinlan, S.S.C, who was the Prefect Apostolic of Chuncheon.

Notes

References
8.https://maryknollmissionarchives.org/deceased-fathers-bro/bishop-patrick-j-byrne-mm/
Additional sources

1888 births
1950 deaths
Religious leaders from Washington, D.C.
St. Charles College alumni
St. Mary's Seminary and University alumni
American Roman Catholic missionaries
Roman Catholic missionaries in Korea
Roman Catholic missionaries in Japan
20th-century American Roman Catholic titular bishops
20th-century Roman Catholic martyrs
Maryknoll bishops
Apostolic Nuncios to South Korea
American expatriates in Japan
Deaths from pneumonia in South Korea
American people who died in prison custody
American people imprisoned abroad
Prisoners who died in North Korean detention
20th-century Roman Catholic bishops in Korea
Roman Catholic bishops of Pyongyang